Giuseppe Elena (1801–1867) was an Italian painter and printmaker.

Biography
He was born in Codogno (Lodi). Having left the seminary in order to devote himself entirely to painting, Elena studied at the Brera Academy of Fine Arts in the 1820s, distinguishing himself for his work as a miniaturist and winning the second-class prize for figure studies in 1826. He obtained a licence to open a lithographic printing shop in 1827 and ran it as a self-taught printer, possibly in response to the growing interest in the engraving technique that had spread quickly at the Brera. When the shop was forced out of business by stiff competition in 1831, the artist continued to work for various publishers, reproducing works by celebrated artists of the time and making prints of views of Lombardy drawn from life. The same subjects – urban views and genre scenes – also featured in the paintings presented at the Brera exhibitions as from 1833. He started to write art criticism in 1841 and worked as a caricaturist on the Milanese periodical L’Uomo di Pietra in 1858 and 1859. He died in Milan in 1867.

References
 Elena Lissoni, Giuseppe Elena , online catalogue Artgate by Fondazione Cariplo, 2010, CC BY-SA (source for the first revision of this article).

Other projects

19th-century Italian painters
Italian male painters
Italian engravers
People from Codogno
1801 births
1867 deaths
19th-century Italian male artists